Richard Rickey Berns (born February 5, 1956) is a former American football running back in the National Football League (NFL). He was selected by the Tampa Bay Buccaneers in the third round of the 1979 NFL Draft and later played for the Los Angeles Raiders. In his final season in 1983, the Raiders won Super Bowl XVIII.

Born at Kadena Air Force Base in Japan, he played high school football in Texas at Wichita Falls and college football at Nebraska under head coach Tom Osborne.

After football, Berns returned to Texas and worked in construction management in San Antonio.

References

External links
Nebraska Cornhuskers bio
Sports Illustrated – cover – November 20, 1978
 Sports Reference – college football statistics – Rick Berns

1956 births
Living people
American football running backs
Nebraska Cornhuskers football players
Tampa Bay Buccaneers players
Los Angeles Raiders players